In Greek mythology, Agave (or 'high-born') may refer to the following characters:
 Agave or Agaue one of the 50 Nereids, sea-nymph daughter of the 'Old Man of the Sea' Nereus and the Oceanid Doris. Agave and her other sisters appeared to Thetis when she cries out in sympathy for the grief of Achilles for Patroclus.

Agave, one of the Danaïdes, daughter of Danaus, king of Libya and Europa, a queen. She married Lycus, son of Aegyptus and Argyphia.
Agave, daughter of Cadmus and mother of Pentheus.
Agave, an Amazon.

Notes

References 

 Apollodorus, The Library with an English Translation by Sir James George Frazer, F.B.A., F.R.S. in 2 Volumes, Cambridge, MA, Harvard University Press; London, William Heinemann Ltd. 1921. ISBN 0-674-99135-4. Online version at the Perseus Digital Library. Greek text available from the same website.
Bell, Robert E., Women of Classical Mythology: A Biographical Dictionary. ABC-Clio. 1991. .
Gaius Julius Hyginus, Fabulae from The Myths of Hyginus translated and edited by Mary Grant. University of Kansas Publications in Humanistic Studies. Online version at the Topos Text Project.
Graves, Robert, The Greek Myths, Harmondsworth, London, England, Penguin Books, 1960. 
Graves, Robert, The Greek Myths: The Complete and Definitive Edition. Penguin Books Limited. 2017. 
 Hesiod, Theogony from The Homeric Hymns and Homerica with an English Translation by Hugh G. Evelyn-White, Cambridge, MA.,Harvard University Press; London, William Heinemann Ltd. 1914. Online version at the Perseus Digital Library. Greek text available from the same website.
 Homer, The Iliad with an English Translation by A.T. Murray, Ph.D. in two volumes. Cambridge, MA., Harvard University Press; London, William Heinemann, Ltd. 1924. . Online version at the Perseus Digital Library.
Homer, Homeri Opera in five volumes. Oxford, Oxford University Press. 1920. . Greek text available at the Perseus Digital Library.
Kerényi, Carl, The Gods of the Greeks, Thames and Hudson, London, 1951.
Smith, William. Dictionary of Greek and Roman Biography and Mythology, London: Taylor, Walton, and Maberly (1873). "Agave"

Danaids
Nereids
Amazons (Greek mythology)
Princesses in Greek mythology
Deities in the Iliad